is a railway station on the Takayama Main Line in city of Toyama, Japan, operated by West Japan Railway Company (JR West). It is also a freight terminal for the Japan Freight Railway Company.

Lines

Layout
The station has two ground-level opposed side platforms serving two tracks. The station is unattended.

Platforms

Adjacent stations

|-
!colspan=5|JR West

History
The station opened on 1 September 1927. With the privatization of Japanese National Railways (JNR) on 1 April 1987, the station came under the control of JR West.

Passenger statistics
In fiscal 2015, the station was used by an average of 364 passengers daily (boarding passengers only).

Surrounding area
Toyama University Gofuku campus
Toyama Industrial High School
Toyama Commercial High School

See also
 List of railway stations in Japan

References

External links

 

Railway stations in Toyama Prefecture
Stations of West Japan Railway Company
Railway stations in Japan opened in 1927
Takayama Main Line
Toyama (city)
Stations of Japan Freight Railway Company